Levent is an underground station on the M2 line of the Istanbul Metro. It is located under Büyükdere Avenue in Levent, the main financial district of Istanbul. Opened on 16 September 2000, Levent is one of the M2 line's six original stations. The station offers connections to İETT city bus service along Büyükdere Avenue, one of the busiest urban roadways in Turkey. Many important financial centers are in the immediate vicinity of the station such as the İşbank Tower 1, Yapı Kredi Headquarters and the Kanyon Shopping Mall which has an underground connection to the station.

Levent is also the western terminus of the M6 line. The M6 line runs east from Levent to Boğaziçi Üniversitesi, and opened on 19 April 2015.

It is in both Beşiktaş and Şişli.

M2 platform
Layout

M6 platform
Layout

References

Railway stations opened in 2000
Istanbul metro stations
Beşiktaş
Şişli
2000 establishments in Turkey